Events in the year 1934 in the Netherlands.

Incumbents
 Monarch: Wilhelmina
 Prime Minister: Hendrikus Colijn

Events 
1 September – The Netherlands education minister, Henri Marchant, accepts the "Kollewijn" proposals for standardizing the spelling of the Dutch language.
unknown date – The Netherlands Antilles national football team (as Curaçao) plays its first international match, against Suriname

Films
Bleeke Bet, directed by Alex Benno and Richard Oswald
Op Hoop van Zegen, directed by Alex Benno and based on a play by Herman Heijermans

Births 

5 January – Eddy Pieters Graafland, football goalkeeper (d. 2020)
8 January – Piet Dankert, politician (d. 2003)
16 August – Ed van Thijn, politician
28 October – Martin van der Borgh, cyclist (d. 2018)
30 October – Frans Brüggen, musician (d. 2014)
19 December – Rudi Carrell, singer and entertainer (d. 2006)

Deaths 

10 January – Marinus van der Lubbe, communist convicted of setting fire to the Reichstag (executed) (b. 1909)
20 March – Emma of Waldeck and Pyrmont, former queen consort and regent (b. 1858)
12 August – Hendrik Petrus Berlage, architect (b. 1856)
29 October – Lou Tellegen, actor (b. 1881)
20 November – Willem de Sitter, mathematician, physicist and astronomer (b. 1872)

References

 
1930s in the Netherlands
Years of the 20th century in the Netherlands
Netherlands
Netherlands